Uvariodendron occidentale is a species of plant in the family Annonaceae. It is found in Cameroon, Ivory Coast, Ghana, Liberia, and Nigeria. It is threatened by habitat loss.

References

occidentale
Vulnerable plants
Flora of Cameroon
Flora of Ivory Coast
Flora of Ghana
Flora of Liberia
Flora of Nigeria
Taxonomy articles created by Polbot
Plants described in 1967